The North Atlantic Track Agreement was an agreement in November 1898 among thirteen passenger steamship companies to use a set series of trans-Atlantic routes that stretched from the northeast of North America to western Europe for the Atlantic crossing. Following the tracks was recommended but not compulsory.

There were seven routes: three to Canada and four to New York and Boston.

The agreement was given government recognition in the 1948 Safety-at-Sea-Convention.

Members
 9 British - White Star Line,
 1 American
 1 Belgian
 1 French
 1 Dutch

References

Sea lanes
1898 establishments in Europe
1898 establishments in North America
1898 in transport
Navigation